Novaya Zarya is a rural locality (a settlement) in Sergeikhinskoye Rural Settlement, Kameshkovsky District, Vladimir Oblast, Russia. The population was 79 as of 2010.

Geography 
Novaya Zarya is located on the Pechuga River, 21 km northwest of Kameshkovo (the district's administrative centre) by road. Novosyolka is the nearest rural locality.

References 

Rural localities in Kameshkovsky District